Anushtegin Gharchai (also spelled Anush-Tegin; ; died 1097) was a Turkic slave commander of the Seljuks and the governor of Khwarazm from approximately 1077 until 1097. He was the first member of his family to play a role in the history of Khwarazm, and the namesake for the dynasty that would rule the province in the 12th and early 13th centuries.

Name 
Anushtegin is a combination of the Iranian word nush/anush ("undying", "born of an undying parent") and the Turkic word tegin ("prince"), thus meaning "immortally-born prince".

Biography 

Anushtegin was originally a Turkic slave from Gharchistan (hence his surname "Gharchai"), but was later sold to the Seljuk officer Gumushtegin Bilge-Beg. Anushtegin first appears in records in 1073, when he and Gumushtegin Bilge-Beg were sent by the Seljuk sultan Malik-Shah I to reconquer territory in northern Khorasan seized by the Ghaznavid ruler Ibrahim. They successfully defeated the latter and razed a Seljuk-Ghaznavid frontier place named Sakalkand. Anushtegin bore the title of shihna (military governor) of Khwarazm, as well as the traditional title of Khwarazmshah.

Since the defeat of the Oghuz Yabghu leader Shah Malik in 1042, Khwarazm had been governed by representatives of the Seljuk Empire. The province would go on to play a minor role in eastern Islamic history for the next decades. The Seljuk sultans deliberately gave the governorship of Khwarazm to Turkic slave-soldiers rather than Seljuk princes, with the exception of Arslan Arghun, who governed the province during the reign of his brother Alp Arslan and early reign of MalikShah I. Geographically, Khwarazm was a peninsula that bordered the Turkic steppes, and as a result was subject to their neighbours' political and linguistic influence. During this period, the local Iranian population of Khwarazm was gradually being assimilated by the Turks. However, during the Seljuk period, the Khwarazmian language (which resembled Sogdian and to a lesser extent Ossetian) was commonly spoken and written.

The details of Anushtegin's tenure as governor are unclear, but he died by 1097 and the post was briefly given to Ekinchi before being transferred to his son, Muhammad I, whose accession is considered the start of the fourth and most prominent line of the Khwarazmshahs (which existed from 1097 to 1231). This new empire would go on to become the most powerful in the eastern Islamic world until the advent of the Mongols.

Notes

References

Sources
  
 
 
 
 

Khwarezmid rulers
1090s deaths
Year of birth unknown
Turkic slaves
Anushtegin dynasty